Robert J. Rubinstein (born 1952) is a social entrepreneur and the founder and driving force behind the TBLI (Triple Bottom Line Investing Group), a group that specializes in environmental, social and governance, ESG and impact investing, using triple bottom line principles.

Early career
From 1974 to 1975 he worked on a kibbutz. From 1975 to 1978 he then worked for CIFAIR, a subsidiary of the Schlumberger oil exploration company, on oil rigs in France Iran and Texas. He also worked on Pillow Furniture in Amsterdam, following his father's footsteps as a tailor in working behind a sewing machine. He then worked for Third Wave Carriers and Creative handbook Europe before working between 1981 and 1998 as publishing editor of five Dutch magazines including Fiets Menu, and Source (the first European corporate social responsibility magazine).

Work for TBLI
He founded and is the creative thought leader behind TBLI in 1998 in Amsterdam. The work has expanded and now includes organizing TBLI Conference, the world's leading International Conference on Responsible investment, advising the European Commission (DG Social and Employment), and running a consultancy firm. Robert lectured for the Rotterdam School of Management (RSM) after setting up their Sustainability program and still provides educational services through TBLI Academy.

He has been mentioned numerous times in the book, 'Partiality of Responsibility' (Ethics in Sustainability Consulting) written by Robert S. Earhart and published 2011.

Boards
Member of the Advisory Board of Ethical Markets
Member of the Advisory Board IMSA (International Sustainability Consultancy)
Member of the Advisory Board BNP Paribas Investment Partners (ESG)
Member of the Advisory Board Green Investment Forum
Member of board ASN Foundation

References

External links
 Robert's bio at TBLI

Living people
1952 births
Brooklyn College alumni
American social entrepreneurs